Rank comparison chart of officers for air forces of Francophone states.

Officers

References

Military ranks of Francophone countries
Military comparisons